Goa is a small town in Botswana.  It lies near the Namibian border, near the Caprivi Strip, and about 11 kilometres from Shakawe which is also the nearest airport.

Statistics 
 Elevation = 999m

References 

North-West District (Botswana)
Villages in Botswana